Faith (December 22, 2002 - September 22, 2014) was a bipedal dog, born with three legs; two fully developed hind legs and a deformed front leg, which was amputated when she was seven months old after it began to atrophy. Her owner, Jude Stringfellow, adopted Faith when the mother dog was found trying to smother the deformed puppy—her son rescued the puppy and brought her home. Many people, including veterinarians, advised that Faith be euthanized. Instead, using a spoon with peanut butter as an incentive, Jude taught Faith to hop. Faith began to walk on her own. The family's corgi would bark at Faith from another room, or nip her heels to urge her to walk.

Faith was given a non-commission rank of E5 Sgt. at Ft. Lewis, Washington in June 2006. She visited more than 2,300 wounded warriors in hospitals and wards throughout the world, and was seen by more than 2,000,000 active soldiers at bases, airports, and ceremonies. She wore an ACU jacket and would get excited when it was pulled out of the closet, as she knew it meant she was about to meet soldiers.

Her death was announced on September 22, 2014.

Media coverage 

A book has been published detailing Faith's story entitled "Faith Walks...A Memoir of a Beautiful Life". Faith and her owner, Jude Stringfellow, have also been featured on Maury, The Oprah Winfrey Show, The Montel Williams Show, Animal Attractions Television and Ripley's Believe it or Not. Faith also had a brief mention on the PBS show NOVA in the episode The Family That Walks On All Fours. 

A short article on Faith that appeared in the "racy" London lad mag Bizarre in 2004 was allegedly the cause of owner Stringfellow's dismissal from her culinary college teaching job. The dog was also rumoured to have been considered for an appearance in Harry Potter and the Goblet of Fire.

In February 2007, MSNBC reported that American Airlines had accidentally sent Faith to a different destination than her owner, after changing planes in Dallas during a flight back from Oklahoma City to Orlando.

See also
 List of the individual dogs

References

External links 
 

Animal amputees
2002 animal births
2014 animal deaths
Individual dogs in the United States